The 2017 M-150 Cup is the tournament for under-23 national teams, held from 9–15 December  at Buriram, Buriram Province, Thailand. The tournament is sponsored by M-150.

Venue
All matches held at the New I-Mobile Stadium in Buriram Province, Thailand.

Matches 
All times are local, Indochina Time (UTC+7)

Group A

Group B

Third place play-off

Final

Winner

Goalscorers
4 goals

 Zabikhillo Urinboev
 Nguyễn Công Phượng

2 goals

 Ayase Ueda
 Yuta Kamiya
 Bobir Abdixolikov
 Nguyễn Quang Hải

1 goal

 Ren Komatsu
 Shion Inoue
 Yoichi Naganuma
 Lwin Moe Aung
 Sithu Aung
 Ri Hun
 Chaiyawat Buran
 Saringkan Promsupa
 Supachok Sarachat
 Phan Văn Long

References

2017 in association football
2017 in Thai football
Buriram province